Charles Bates (born Charles Perry on January 15, 1935) is a former American child actor. He appeared in about 43 films between 1941 and 1952, mostly in small roles. He is probably best known as young Roger Newton in Alfred Hitchcock's thriller Shadow of a Doubt (1943). Other notable roles include The North Star (1943), San Diego, I Love You (1944), Pursued (1947) and Shockproof (1949). His last film was The Snows of Kilimanjaro, where he played Gregory Peck's character as a 17-year-old.

Bates went on to study electrical engineering and retired from the State of California in 1996 as a Senior Electrical Engineer. He lives in the Pacific Northwest.

Filmography 

 Tall, Dark and Handsome (1941) - Boy (uncredited)
 Blossoms in the Dust (1941) - (uncredited)
 The Mexican Spitfire's Baby (1941) - Little Boy (uncredited)
 The Vanishing Virginian (1942) - Yancey's Grandson (uncredited)
 I Married a Witch (1942) - Wooley's Son (uncredited)
 Shadow of a Doubt (1943) - Roger Newton
 The Man from Down Under (1943) - French Boy (uncredited)
 Hostages (1943) - Peter (uncredited)
 The Strange Death of Adolf Hitler (1943) - Viki Huber
 Son of Dracula (1943) - Tommy Land (uncredited)
 The North Star (1943) - Patya
 In Old Oklahoma (1943) - Little Sun (uncredited)
 The Song of Bernadette (1943) - Adolard Bouhouhorts - Age 7 (uncredited)
 The Fighting Sullivans (1944) - Rival Boy (uncredited)
 Lady in the Dark (1944) - David (uncredited)
 The Curse of the Cat People (1944) - Jack (uncredited)
 Once Upon a Time (1944) - Boy (uncredited)
 In the Meantime, Darling (1944) - Boy (uncredited)
 San Diego, I Love You (1944) - Larry McCooley
 An American Romance (1944) - Teddy Roosevelt Dangos - Age 8 (uncredited)
 And Now Tomorrow (1944) - Frightened Boy (uncredited)
 Destiny (1944) - Boy (uncredited)
 The Clock (1945) - Child (uncredited)
 Mama Loves Papa (1945) - Boy (uncredited)
 Danny Boy (1945) - Louie
 The Hoodlum Saint (1946) - Johnny Ryan's Brother (uncredited)
 The Green Years (1946) - Angelo Friscalli (uncredited)
 The Virginian (1946) - Boy Prisoner (uncredited)
 Night in Paradise (1946) - Boy (uncredited)
 Three Wise Fools (1946) - Eddie Oakleaf (uncredited)
 My Brother Talks to Horses (1947) - Boy at School (uncredited)
 Pursued (1947) - Adam, age 11
 Little Mister Jim (1947) - Neighbor Boy (uncredited)
 Golden Earrings (1947) - Minor Role (uncredited)
 Merton of the Movies (1947) - Boy in Theatre (uncredited)
 Her Husband's Affairs (1947) - Boy (uncredited)
 Summer Holiday (1948) - Boy (uncredited)
 The Three Musketeers (1948) - D'Artagnan's Brother (uncredited)
 Shockproof (1949) - Tommy Marat
 The Sun Comes Up (1949) - Orphan (uncredited)
 The Snows of Kilimanjaro (1952) - Harry at Seventeen (uncredited) (final film role)

References

External links 

1935 births
American male television actors
American male film actors
Living people
20th-century American male actors
Male actors from Los Angeles